The Laundress (La Blanchisseuse) (also known in English as The Washerwoman) is an oil-on-panel painted by French artist Honoré Daumier in 1863. It is exhibited at the Musée d'Orsay in Paris. The subject of laundresses, also known as washerwomen, was a popular one in art, especially in France.

History
Acquired by the Louvre in 1927 and since 1986 exhibited at the Musée d'Orsay, this painting has another two versions, currently housed at the Metropolitan Museum of Art, in New York, and at the Albright-Knox Art Gallery of Buffalo, New York.

Daumier lived on the Quai d'Anjou on the Île Saint-Louis in central Paris, and had plenty of opportunities for observing the attitudes of the washerwomen returning from the lavoir on the Seine, as they wearily climbed the stone steps, bent beneath the weight of their bundles of washing. Nevertheless, there is a strength as well as fatigue expressed in the body of this mature woman, accompanied by her child, whom there is evidently nobody to mind at home. The summary handling of the paint avoids any suggestion of anecdote and gives a monumental quality to this little picture.

As said, Daumier painted several variations on this theme: numerous replicas of them exist, some apocryphal. The Louvre-acquired work appears, according to critics, to be far the best. One of them – under the title Blanchisseuse – was exhibited by the painter at the Salon of 1861.

Notes

References

Lejeune, Robert, Honoré Daumier, Lausanne (1953)
Maison, K.-E., Honoré Daumier, Catalogue raisonné of the paintings, watercolors and drawings, London (1968)
Mandel, Gabriele, Tout l'oeuvre peint de Daumier, Paris (1972) 
Compin, Isabelle – Roquebert Anne, Catalogue sommaire illustré des peintures du Musée du Louvre et du Musée d'Orsay, Paris (1986) 
Compin, Isabelle – Lacambre, Geneviève (eds)- Musée d'Orsay. Catalogue sommaire illustré des peintures, Paris (1990)

External links
 La Blanchisseuse at the Musée d'Orsay
Honoré Daumier (French, 1808 – 1879) on MutualArt.com
Works at the Musée d'Orsay: paintings and especially good selection of sculptures
Daumier Website, complete website on Daumier's life and work; Bibliography, Exhibitions etc.
Daumier's biography, style and critical reception
Web Gallery of Art
Daumier Drawings, an exhibition catalog from The Metropolitan Museum of Art (fully available online as PDF), which contains information on this painting

1863 paintings
Paintings by Honoré Daumier
Paintings in the collection of the Musée d'Orsay
Paintings in the collection of the Metropolitan Museum of Art
Paintings in the collection of the Albright–Knox Art Gallery